Ad Astra is a play-by-mail game that was published by Superior Simulations. It was a computer moderated, turn-based space fantasy game designed by John M. Ess.

Gameplay
Ad Astra was a computer-moderated science fiction play-by-mail game, with a fixed deadline and a strategic focus.

New players received a 30-page rulebook which, in 1987, cost $2. Players operated on a hex grid of 225 stars, manipulating various elements of gameplay to include various types of starships, ground defense units, and starbases. Conquest and expansion as well as diplomacy among players played key roles in Ad Astra. Players also had to manage the costs of new elements of gameplay, as overspending affected remaining points at the end of the game, with the player with the highest number of points being victorious.

Reception
Ad Astra was reviewed in The February–March 1987 issue of Space Gamer/Fantasy Gamer. The reviewer commented, "For those people who like this type of game, I don't think that there is a better one of its type on the PBM market today. It is a well-oiled machine.  But then so is a fork lift. I can respect the efficient design of a fort lift, but I sure can't get excited about one. So, if you are the type of player who revels in objective and detached exercised of logic, look no farther. Ad Astra is well worth your money and time." Jim Townsend gave Ad Astra a positive review in the May–June 1987 issue of Paper Mayhem,  stating, "I highly recommend Ad Astra to anyone who likes good, active space games at a very reasonable price", while also noting that "the service is some of the best in the industry".

In the September–October 1992 issue of Paper Mayhem magazine, Ad Astra was ranked No. 68 of 84 play-by-mail games by its readers.

See also 
 List of play-by-mail games

Notes

References

Bibliography

Further reading 
 
 
 

Play-by-mail games